Thirtha Prabandha is one of the main Sanskrit works by Sri Vadiraja Swamy, the 16th century Dvaita philosopher and saint. The document is written in the form of a travelogue and contains descriptions of pilgrim centers throughout India.

The work comprises 235 shlokas and is divided into 4 chapters, one for each direction. Sri Vadiraja Swamy composed this document during his extensive pilgrimage throughout India. The shlokas, in addition to describing the places, also provides information on the sacredness of the places and praises the deities.

The chapter covering North India mentions important places such as Pandarapur, Prayag, Kashi, Gaya, Mathura and Ayodhya. The chapter on South India covers Rameshwaram, Kanyakumari and Trivandrum. The chapter on West India covers Pajaka, Udupi, Gokarna and Kolhapur. The chapter on East covers Puri, Ahobila and Hampi. A total of about 100 places are covered in the document. In addition to holy places, a lot of rivers, including Ganges, Yamuna, Kaveri and Godavari are mentioned.

Thirtha Prabandha is held in high esteem amongst practising Madhvas and a recitation of all the shlokas is considered equal to an actual pilgrimage covering all the mentioned places.

See also 
 Works of Madhvacharya
 Sodhe

External links 
 Tirtha prabandha
 archive on tirtha prabandha text in kannada
 Works by Sri Vadiraja Tirtha
 Sri Vadiraja - The Saint
 Thirtha Prabhanda Locations in Google Maps

Dvaita Vedanta
Hindu texts
Sanskrit texts